The 1935–36 season was the 37th season in the history of Berner Sport Club Young Boys. The team played their home games at Stadion Wankdorf in Bern, placing 6th in the Nationalliga, and being eliminated in the semi-finals of the Swiss Cup.

Players
 Roger Droguet
 Achille Siegrist
 Max Horisberger
 Fritz Lehmann
 Hans Liniger
 Fritz Künzi
 Attilio Mordasini
 Louis Favre
 Vilmos Sipos
 Franjo Petrak
 Paul Aebi

Competitions

Overall record

Nationalliga

League table

Matches

Swiss Cup

References

BSC Young Boys seasons
Swiss football clubs 1935–36 season